Şehit Polis Recep Topaloğlu Sports Hall is a multi-purpose indoor arena located in Izmit of Kocaeli Province, Turkey.

The venue is used for competitions and trainings of a wide variety of sports branches including basketball, volleyball, handball, fencing, table tennis, wrestling, judo, karate, kick boxing and taekwondo. Opened officially on 6 August 2012, it has a seating capacity of 5,000.

The sports hall is named in honor of Recep Topaloğlu, a swimming instructor as well as amateur footballer from İzmit, and member of the Police Special Operation Force, who was killed in action during a clash with Kurdish militants on Mount Judi in Şırnak Province, southeastern Anatolia on 21 March 2012.

Events hosted
 2012–13 Turkish Cup Basketball
 2014–15 EHF Champions League group stage
 2015 Boys' Youth European Volleyball Championship

References

Sports venues completed in 2012
Basketball venues in Turkey
Volleyball venues in Turkey
Handball venues in Turkey
Sports venues in İzmit
2012 establishments in Turkey